Marko Maschke (born June 9, 1967) is a German football manager who managed clubs professionally in Europe and in North America.

Managerial career
Maschke began coaching at the lower leagues in Germany with BSC Rehberge Berlin in 1992. After several years with Berlin he went abroad to China to sign with Chengdu Tiancheng F.C. With Tiancheng he won promotion for the club in 1997. In 2002, he went to Canada to sign with newly expansion Hamilton Thunder of the Canadian Professional Soccer League. He resigned midway through the season due to disputes with Hamilton's team owner Italo Ferrari over unpaid salaries. He returned to Europe to coach Füchse Berlin Reinickendorf and 1. FC Schweinfurt 05 at the U-19 levels. From 2005-2007 he served as assistant coach with Tennis Borussia Berlin, until returning to first team duties with Integrál-DAC in Hungary.

References 

1967 births
German football managers
Expatriate soccer managers in Canada
Living people
Canadian Soccer League (1998–present) managers